, also called Ogawa Bimei, was an author of short stories, children's stories, and fairy tales. Because he was one of the first authors to publish children's stories under his own name, Ogawa has been called Japan's Hans Christian Andersen, an appellation he shares with Kurushima Takehiko.

Life 
Ogawa studied at the Faculty of English Literature at Waseda University, where he graduated in 1905. That same year, Ogawa published his first literary work. Waseda University was at that time the center of the Japanese Naturalism movement. In 1910 Ogawa published his first fairy tale.

Work 
Ogawa is known in Japan as the founder of modern children's literature. Ogawa often chose everyday scenarios for his children's stories. Two of his most famous stories are The Mermaid and the Red Candles and The Cow Woman. The Cow Woman, published in 1919, described a mother whose soul could not rest after her death, because her son was left in wretched poverty. The mother appears to her son in different apparitions to help lead him down the right path.

Ogawa's stories often incorporate religious and philosophical symbolism and the cycle of life. The death of creatures is not final, but is instead just the opportunity to appear in a different form, such as in The Cow Woman.

References

External links
 
 Full text of an English translation of Mimei Ogawa's "The Life of a Musical Instrument" (楽器の生命)

Japanese male short story writers
19th-century Japanese novelists
20th-century Japanese novelists
1882 births
1961 deaths